The Lilac Sunbonnet is a 1922 British silent drama film directed by Sidney Morgan and starring Joan Morgan, Warwick Ward and Pauline Peters.

Cast
 Warwick Ward as Ralph Peden 
 Joan Morgan as Winsome Charteris 
 Pauline Peters as Jess Kissock
 Lewis Dayton as Capt. Greatorix 
 Nell Emerald as Meg Kissock 
 Forrester Harvey as Jock Gordon 
 Arthur Lennard as Rev. Allen Walsh 
 Charles Levey as Walter 
 A. Harding Steerman as Rev. Gilbert Peden

References

Bibliography
 Low, Rachael. The History of the British Film 1918-1929. George Allen & Unwin, 1971.

External links
 

1922 films
British drama films
British silent feature films
Films directed by Sidney Morgan
1922 drama films
Films based on British novels
Films set in England
British black-and-white films
1920s English-language films
1920s British films
Silent drama films